Triax Technologies, Inc., also known as Triax, is a Connecticut-based technology company that develops and delivers IoT technology for the construction industry.

The company was founded in 2012 by Dale and Chad Hollingsworth, who recognized an opportunity to combine wearable and wireless communication technology to measure the force of head impacts in contact sports.

Triax's headquarters are located in Norwalk, Connecticut with a Product Development office in East Hartford, Connecticut.

Spot-r by Triax 
Triax's flagship Spot-r system connects workers, equipment and managers through a proprietary, minimal infrastructure network, sensors, and a cloud-based dashboard.

Spot-r's wearable device, known as the Spot-r Clip, is worn by each worker and automatically connects to the Spot-r network on site to provide real-time worker location and activity data. The device automatically records and transmits slip, trip and fall events to designated supervisors via text message, dashboard or email notifications.  By alerting site personnel to an accident the moment it occurs, and providing the zone- and floor-based location on site, Spot-r reduces response time and improves overall injury management. A push-button on the wearable device allows workers to report unsafe conditions, site hazards or other potential injuries in real-time without leaving their work area. Supervisors can also trigger a site wide evacuation alert to each worker's device in case of emergency.

The cloud dashboard provides aggregate on-going and historical data on worker time and attendance, location, certification, subcontractor activity, and safety incidents. The network uploads workforce and project data to the cloud over a cellular connection, allowing off-site managers to view site operations and safety incidents remotely.

In October 2017, Spot-r was awarded a Business Insurance 2017 Innovation Award for innovative risk management products and services. Automatic incident data, including who, when, where, and distance of fall, helps risk managers and insurers identify, assess and manage risk and protect against potentially fraudulent claims.

Spot-r EquipTag 
In November 2017, Triax announced the Spot-r EquipTag, which tracks operator identity, equipment location, and equipment utilization without the limitations of traditional telematics solutions such as equipment size or indoor/outdoor location. The sensor uses the Spot-r network to track location and utilization and layers in Spot-r Clip workforce and certification data to identify how equipment is being operated and by whom at the job site.

Partnerships 
In August 2017, Triax announced a two-way integration with Procore Technologies' project management platform. The integration automatically sends Spot-r worksite data, including man hours and safety incidents, to Procore for accidents, timecards, manpower and daily construction reports.

In October 2017, Triax announced that Lettire Construction Corporation is the first New York City contractor to implement Spot-r at its job site.

In November 2017, Triax announced an integration with the Autodesk BIM 360 construction management platform. The integration allows Spot-r users to view the current location of workers on 3D BIM (Building Information Modeling) models.

Triax Smart Impact Monitor
Triax previously manufactured and sold two sports products, the SIM-P for individual athletes and the SIM-G for teams and organizations, designed and developed to measure the force and frequency of head impacts in real-time. The Smart Impact Monitor (SIM) embedded a small sensor in either a headband or skullcap to measure hits to head during sporting practice and activity. The sensors contain a 3-axis high-g linear accelerometer that measures 3 to 400 G’s, and a 3-axis gyroscope to capture rotational acceleration.

In October 2014, Triax announced a partnership with retired American soccer player, Abby Wambach, to launch the SIM-P to support long-term player health and safety. Abby suffered a concussion on April 20, 2013, while playing for the Western New York Flash of the NWSL. Abby Wambach promoted the SIM-P to remind players of all ages that good technique can help improve their soccer game and can help avoid injury. President and co-founder Chad Hollingsworth appeared on CBS This Morning to talk about concussions in women's soccer during the 2015 FIFA Women's World Cup.

See also
Construction
Construction site safety
Internet of Things
Wearable technology

References

Companies based in Norwalk, Connecticut